Wyoming High School may refer to:
Wyoming High School (Michigan) in Wyoming, Michigan, a suburb of Grand Rapids
Wyoming High School (Ohio) in Wyoming, Ohio, a suburb of Cincinnati
 Wyoming Area High School of the Wyoming Area School District in Exeter, Luzerne, Pennsylvania